Trebinjsko Lake is an artificial lake of Bosnia and Herzegovina. It is located in the municipality of Trebinje. it was created as a reservoir by damming the Trebišnjica river just few kilometers upstream from Trebinje town with a facility and dam, Trebinje II Hydroelectric Power Station.

See also
List of lakes in Bosnia and Herzegovina

References

Lakes of Bosnia and Herzegovina
Popovo Polje
Lower Horizons Hydroelectric Power Stations System
Hydroelectric power stations in Bosnia and Herzegovina
Trebišnjica
Trebišnjica river damming and regulation controversy